Rhaebo is a genus of true toads, family Bufonidae, from Central and South America. They are distributed from Honduras to northern South America including the Amazonian lowlands. Common name Cope toads has been suggested for them.

Taxonomy
The genus was removed from the synonymy of Bufo in 2006; an alternative view has been to treat it as a subgenus of Bufo. At present, it is widely recognized as a genus.

Andinophryne, consisting of three species, was recognized as a separate genus until 2015 when it was found out that its recognition rendered Rhaebo paraphyletic. An alternative to synonymizing it with Rhaebo would have been to erect a new genus for Rhaebo nasicus, but this would have caused difficulty in assigning species without molecular data to correct genus.

Description
Rhaebo are characterized as lacking cephalic crests, having omosternum, distinctively wide sphenethmoid, prominent and notched exoccipital condyles, and yellowish-orange skin secretions. It is not clear which of these characters are ancestral and which are derived (i.e., synapomorphies).

Species
There are 13 species in this genus:

References

 
Amphibian genera
Amphibians of Central America
Amphibians of South America